Theoretical Population Biology is a peer-reviewed scientific journal covering research on theoretical aspects population biology in its widest sense, including mathematical modelling of populations, ecology, evolution, genetics, demography, and epidemiology. The editor-in-chief is Noah A. Rosenberg (Stanford University), who in January 2013 succeeded the founding editor Marcus Feldman (Stanford University). The journal has a partnership with the journal Genetics, exchanging manuscripts in between the two if they are a better fit of the other journal's scope.

Abstracting and indexing 
The journal is abstracted and indexed in:

According to the Journal Citation Reports, the journal has a 2020 impact factor of 1.57.

References

External links
 

Elsevier academic journals
Mathematical and theoretical biology journals
Publications established in 1970
English-language journals
Bimonthly journals